The Philadelphia Society is a membership organization the purpose of which is "to sponsor the interchange of ideas through discussion and writing, in the interest of deepening the intellectual foundation of a free and ordered society, and of broadening the understanding of its basic principles and traditions". The membership of the Society tends to be composed of persons holding conservative or libertarian political views, and many of those associated with the Society have exercised considerable influence over the development of the conservative movement in the United States.

History
The Philadelphia Society was founded in 1964 by Donald Lipsett in conjunction with William F. Buckley Jr., Milton Friedman, Frank Meyer, and Ed Feulner.  Former Presidents of the Society include Henry Regnery, Edwin Feulner, Russell Kirk, Mel Bradford, Forrest McDonald, T. Kenneth Cribb,  M. Stanton Evans, Ellis Sandoz, Edwin Meese, Claes G. Ryn, Midge Decter, Roger Ream, Steven F. Hayward, Lee Edwards, William F. Buckley Jr., and George H. Nash.

Notable speakers at past meetings of the Society have included Larry Arnhart, Andrew Bacevich, Wendell Berry, Robert Bork, Mel Bradford, Warren T. Brookes, William F. Buckley Jr., Vladimir Bukovsky, Ronald Coase, T. Kenneth Cribb, Midge Decter, M. Stanton Evans, Edwin Feulner, Milton Friedman, George Gilder, Victor Davis Hanson, William Hague, S. I. Hayakawa, Friedrich von Hayek, Henry Hazlitt, W.H. Hutt, Herman Kahn, Russell Kirk, Irving Kristol, Erik von Kuehnelt-Leddihn, Forrest McDonald, Edwin Meese, Frank Meyer, Charles Murray,  Robert Nisbet, Michael Novak, Richard Pipes, Norman Podhoretz, Henry Regnery, William A. Rusher, Paul Ryan, Ellis Sandoz,  Shelby Steele, George J. Stigler, Terry Teachout, Edward H. Teller, and Eric Voegelin.

Notable members
 Manuel Ayau
 Stephen Balch
 Richard Cornuelle
 Donald J. Devine
 Mark C. Henrie
 G. Philip Hughes
 Giancarlo Ibarguen
 Wilfred M. McClay
 William Murchison
 Jacqueline E. Schafer
 Jane S. Shaw
 Lowell C. Smith

References

External links
 
 Organizational Profile – National Center for Charitable Statistics (Urban Institute)

Conservative organizations in the United States
Libertarian organizations based in the United States
Organizations established in 1964
Political and economic think tanks in the United States